Ba, Bâ, and Bah are potentially related West African surnames, usually of Fula origin. In the Fula culture of Mali and Senegal, the surname Diakité is considered equivalent.

Ba
 Adame Ba Konaré (born 1947), a Malian Historian and former first lady
 Amadou Ba (disambiguation), several people
 Amadou Dia Ba (born 1958), a Senegalese athlete
 Demba Ba (born 1985), a Senegalese footballer
 Georges Ba (born 1979), an Ivorian footballer
 Ibrahim Ba (born 1973), a French footballer
 Ibrahima Ba (footballer born 1984), a Senegalese footballer
 Inday Ba (1972–2005), a Swedish–British actress
 Ismail Ba (born 1974), a Senegalese footballer
 Issa Ba (born 1981), a Senegalese footballer
 Papa Malick Ba (born 1980), a Senegalese footballer
 Pape Samba Ba (born 1982), a Senegalese footballer
 Sadio Ba (b. 1973), a Belgian footballer
 Teresa Nzola Meso Ba (born 1983), an Angolan–French triple jumper

Bâ
 Alioune Bâ (born 1959), a Malian photographer
 Koli Tenguella Bâ (born 14**), founder of the great Denyankés dynasty that ruled over 3 centuries in between Senegal, Mali, and Mauritania 
 Alioune Bâ (born 19**), a Senegalese political leader
 Amadou Bâ (disambiguation), several people
 Amadou Hampâté Bâ (c. 1901–1991), a Malian writer and ethnologist
 Maba Diakhou Bâ (1809–1867), a Senegalese Muslim and religious leader
 Mariama Bâ (1929–1981), a Senegalese author and feminist
 Youssouf Sambo Bâ (born 1942), a Burkinabé politician and former teacher

Bah
 Abdallah Bah (born 1975), a Guinean footballer
 Alexander Bah (born 1997), Danish footballer
 Algassime Bah (born 2002),  Guinean footballer
 Almamy Schuman Bah (born 1974), a Guinean footballer
 Dawda Bah (born 1983), a Gambian footballer
 Hamat Bah, Gambian politician
 Ibrahim Bah (born 1969), a Sierra Leonean footballer
 Mahmadu Alphajor Bah (born 1981), a Sierra Leonean footballer
 Thierno Bah (born 1982), a Guinean footballer

References

Fula surnames
Muslim communities lists
Senegalese surnames
Gambian surnames
Surnames of Mauritanian origin
Surnames of Senegalese origin
Surnames of Vietnamese origin